This is a list of the number-one songs of 2018 in Venezuela. The airplay charts are published by Monitor Latino, based on airplay across radio stations in Venezuela utilizing the Radio Tracking Data, LLC in real time. Charts are compiled from Monday to Sunday.
Besides the General chart, Monitor Latino publishes "Nacional", "Latino", "Pop", "Anglo", "Urbano", "Tradicional", "Tropical" and "Vallenato" charts.

Chart history (Monitor Latino)

Chart history (Record Report)

References

2018
Number-one songs
Venezuela